OMH may refer to:
 Omh (trigraph), a Latin-script trigraph used in Irish
 musicOMH, a music website
 Office of Minority Health, an office of the United States government
 The Old Malthouse School, a closed preparatory school in Langton Matravers, Dorset, England
 Old Market Hall, an Elizabethan building in Shrewsbury, Shropshire, England
 Orange County Airport (Virginia), in  Orange County, Virginia, United States
 Urmia Airport, in Urmia County, West Azerbaijan Province, Iran